Pitkern, also known as Pitcairn-Norfolk or Pitcairnese, is a language spoken on Pitcairn and Norfolk islands. It is a mixture of English and Tahitian, and has been given many classifications by scholars, including cant, patois, and Atlantic Creole. Although spoken on Pacific Ocean islands, it has been described as an Atlantic Creole due to the lack of connections with other English-based creoles of the Pacific. There are fewer than 50 speakers on Pitcairn Island, a number which has been steadily decreasing since 1971.

History
Following the Mutiny on the Bounty on 28 April 1789, the British mutineers stopped at Tahiti and took 18 Polynesians, mostly women, to remote Pitcairn Island and settled there. A pidgin was formed based on English and Tahitian so that the English mutineers could communicate with the Tahitian women they brought to the previously uninhabited Pitcairn Island. The Pitkern language was influenced by the diverse English dialects and accents of the crew. Geographically, the mutineers were drawn from as far as the West Indies, with one mutineer being described as speaking a forerunner of a Caribbean patois. One was a Scot from the Isle of Lewis. At least one, the leader Fletcher Christian, was a well-educated man, which at the time made a major difference in speech. Both Geordie and West Country dialects have obvious links to some Pitkern phrases and words, such as whettles, meaning food, from victuals.

The first children born on Pitcairn Island mainly spoke a mixture of non-standard varieties of English and the contact language. In the 1830s, Pitkern's local prestige increased, and the language started to be used in church and school. In 1856, 194 residents of Pitcairn Island moved to Norfolk island, where many residents continued to use Pitkern in their households.

After 1914, the Australian government tried to end the use of Pitkern/Norf'k by restricting its use in public spaces.

Relationship to Norf'k

Norf'k is descended predominantly from Pitkern. When the residents of Pitcairn Island moved to Norfolk Island, they brought the language with them. The language developed and changed over time. The relative ease of travel from English-speaking countries such as Australia, New Zealand or Papua New Guinea to Norfolk Island, particularly when compared with that of travel to the Pitcairn Islands, has meant that Norf'k has been exposed to much greater contact with English relative to Pitkern. The difficulties in accessing the Pitcairn population have meant that a serious comparison of the two languages for mutual intelligibility has proven difficult.

The exact relationship between these two languages is a point of contention for scholars. Some believe that the difference between Pitkern and Norf'k is negligible, while others believe that Standard English is more present in Norf'k than it is in Pitkern.

Common phrases 

Note: Pitkern spelling is not standardised.

Excerpts from a transcription of Pitkern 
The sentences below are excerpted from a longer dialogue held in 1951 between a teenage speaker of Pitkern and A.W. Moverley, a foreigner who worked as a schoolteacher on Pitcairn during the mid-20th century. The dialogue was recorded by Moverley and later transcribed in the International Phonetic Alphabet by A.C. Gimson, with translations to English provided by Moverley.

Poetry in Pitkern
Some poetry exists in Pitkern. The poems of Meralda Warren are of particular note.

See also
 Australian English
 Pitcairn Islands languages
 Norfuk language

References

External links

 Ross, Alan Strode Campbell  and A.W. Moverly. The Pitcairnese Language (1964). London: Oxford University Press.
 South Pacific phrasebook (1999). Hawthorn, Australia: Lonely Planet Publications.
History of writing pitkern and norf-k

Languages of Oceania
English-based pidgins and creoles
Pitcairn Islands culture
Society of the Pitcairn Islands
Languages of the Pitcairn Islands
Languages of the United Kingdom
Cant languages
Vulnerable languages